The Jesse H. Jones Graduate School of Business is the  graduate business school of Rice University, a private research university in Houston, Texas. Named in honor of Jesse Holman Jones, a Houston business and civic leader, the school received its initial funding in 1974 through a major gift from the Houston Endowment Inc., a philanthropic foundation established by Jones and his wife, Mary Gibbs Jones. The schools offers the Master of Business Administration (MBA), Master of Accounting (MAcc), and Doctorate in Philosophy (PhD) degrees. In addition, the school offers several joint degree programs, including the MD/MBA with Baylor College of Medicine, MBA/ME with Rice’s George R. Brown School of Engineering, and MBA/MS with Rice’s Wiess School of Natural Sciences. The school also provides an undergraduate business minor, executive education, and certificates.

Jones School

Academics

MBA program 
The Jesse H. Jones Graduate School of Business offers a Master of Business Administration program. The program was ranked 23rd on the U.S. News & World Reports 2019 ranking of best graduate-level business schools.

At graduation, nearly 83% of graduates in the full-time program are employed.

Electives are offered in your second-year and a Capstone Course is required at the end of your second year.

Hybrid Online MBA program 
MBA@Rice is an online degree for working professionals that started in 2018. The program also added a number of short courses including project management. The program can be completed in two years with 54 credits required. Students have small-group online sessions and have access to pre-recorded content. There is also an on-campus component with two residential sessions.

Master of Accounting Program 

The Master of Accounting program is an intensive, one-year program designed to prepare students for the Uniform CPA Exam. The program targets non-accounting undergraduate majors, and conditions students for recruitment with the Big 4 accounting firms.

Rankings 

Princeton Review's 2020 rankings placed the Jones School #1 in the U.S. for M.B.A. in entrepreneurship, #3 for finance, and #8 for best classroom experience. U.S. News & World Report ranked the Jones School full-time MBA program among top 25 U.S business schools in 2016., Bloomberg Businessweek's 2015 rankings placed the Jones School among top 10 U.S business schools in 2016 and the 3rd best part-time MBA in 2015, and The Financial Times 2014 rankings placed the school 35 in Global Business Schools and 19th amongst U.S. business schools – the highest ranked business school in Texas and the Southwest.

Initiatives

Rice Alliance for Technology and Entrepreneurship 
The Rice Alliance for Technology and Entrepreneurship is Rice's flagship entrepreneurship initiative based on a strategic alliance among the schools of engineering, science, and business. Since its inception in late 1999, the Rice Alliance has assisted in the launch of over 1,500 start-ups which have raised more than $2.9 billion in funding. The Rice Alliance is host to the Rice Business Plan Competition, the world's largest and richest student startup competition with nearly $3 million in prizes. The Rice Alliance was ranked No. 1 among top university business incubators in 2013 and 2014.

Notable alumni
 Mitch Bainwol, Chairman and CEO of the Recording Industry Association of America; former Chief-of-Staff to U.S. Senate Majority Leader Bill Frist
 Douglas Foshee - '92 CEO of El Paso Corporation
 Linda Ham, Program Integration Manager at NASA who faced criticism for her role in the Challenger disaster
 Jim Turley, former chairman and CEO of professional services firm Ernst & Young

See also
List of United States business school rankings
List of business schools in the United States

References

Rice University
Business schools in Texas
Educational institutions established in 1974